Earthling in the City is a 6-track promotional CD by David Bowie that was distributed by GQ magazine with their November 1997 issue. The disc is largely made up of live performances and remixes of songs drawn from Bowie's albums Black Tie White Noise, Outside, and Earthling.

Track listing
 "Little Wonder" (Recorded live in New York City, 9 January 1997) – 3:44
 "Seven Years in Tibet (Edit)" – 3:59
 "Pallas Athena" (Recorded live in Amsterdam, 10 June 1997) – 8:28
 "The Hearts Filthy Lesson" (Recorded live in New York City, 9 January 1997) – 5:03
 "Telling Lies (Paradox Mix by A Guy Called Gerald)" – 5:12
 "Seven Years in Tibet (Mandarin Version)" – 3:58

References

External links
Discogs entry

1997 EPs
David Bowie EPs